Surattha is a genus of moths of the family Crambidae. The genus was synonymized with Prionapteryx by Stanisław Błeszyński in 1967. Its status was later revised by Graziano Bassi and Wolfram Mey in 2011.

Description
Its palpi are porrect (extending forward) and thickly scaled, extending about one and half times length of head. Maxillary palp triangularly scaled. Frons with a conical process. Antennae of male bipectinated, usually with long branches. Tibia with long spurs, where the outer spurs about two-thirds the length of the inner. Forewings long and narrow, with rounded apex. Vein 3 from near angle of cell and veins 4 and 5 usually on a long stalk. Veins 6, 7, 10 and 11 free. Hindwings with vein 3 from near angle of cell and vein 5 absent. Vein 6 obsolescent from above middle of discocellulars and vein 7 anastomosing (fusing) with vein 8.

Species
Surattha africalis (Hampson, 1919)
Surattha albipunctella Marion, 1957
Surattha albistigma Wileman & South, 1918
Surattha albostigmata Rothschild, 1921
Surattha amselella Błeszyński, 1965
Surattha carmensita (Błeszyński, 1970)
Surattha diffusilinea Hampson, 1919
Surattha fuscilella Swinhoe, 1895
Surattha invectalis Walker, 1863
Surattha luteola Bassi & Mey in Mey, 2011
Surattha margherita Błeszyński, 1965
Surattha nigrifascialis (Walker, 1866)
Surattha obeliscota Meyrick, 1936
Surattha rufistrigalis Fawcett, 1918
Surattha soudanensis Hampson, 1919
Surattha strioliger Rothschild, 1913

References

Ancylolomiini
Crambidae genera
Taxa named by Francis Walker (entomologist)